Marion Barter (born 3 October 1945) is an Australian missing person, teacher, and mother of two, who disappeared on Sunday 22 June 1997 from Southport, Queensland. She was dropped off at a bus station in Surfers Paradise, Queensland to go to the airport for a planned, long-term vacation in England. She has not been seen since.

For years, police maintained that Barter's disappearance was voluntary, although their attempts to locate her were unsuccessful. But in 2019, after extensive international media coverage and new legal proceedings lodged by her daughter, Sally Leydon, her case was taken over by the Unsolved Homicide Squad in Sydney and authorities are now handling it as an active homicide investigation.

Barter's case is featured in the ongoing Australian crime podcast, The Lady Vanishes, a Seven News production and one of Apple's Best Listens of 2019. Her case also garnered significant speculation on internet message boards and forums, with theories ranging from identity theft to mental illness to witness protection and murder.

Background 
Marion Wilson was born in 1945 to Jack Wilson and Colleen Wilson. She had three sisters. In 1967, she married professional football player Johnny Warren. They divorced in 1969. Her daughter Sally was born in 1973, followed by a son Owen born in 1974. She married their father, Stuart Brown, in 1977. They divorced in 1979, and in 1985 she married Ray Barter. They divorced in 1990.

In 1994, Barter purchased a home for $180,000 in Merinda Court in Southport and began work as a teacher at The Southport School, where she was awarded the Queensland Teaching Excellence Award in 1996 by Ita Buttrose. On 25 April 1997, Barter sold her home in a quick sale for $165,000.

On 15 May 1997 she changed her name via deed poll to Florabella Natalia Marion Remakel and obtained a passport under her new name. However, she continued to use her previous name at work and in correspondence with family and friends, and never mentioned her name change to anyone.

One month later, on 20 June 1997, Barter resigned from work, citing in her resignation letter her desire to travel and find a new job teaching in England. The letter also made a request to renew her teacher's certification for the next school year. On 22 June 1997, she left Australia for a year-long vacation in England with plans to travel throughout the United Kingdom and Europe. While on vacation, Barter sent family, friends, and former students postcards, letters, and gifts from locations around England postmarked Tunbridge Wells in Kent, Sussex, and London.

She also called her daughter, Sally Leydon, in late July and early August. They spoke for the last time on the evening of 1 August 1997. Barter mentioned that she was extending her stay in Tunbridge Wells and decided to reschedule her upcoming reservation to ride the Orient Express. This was the last time she was ever heard from.

Early investigations 
Barter's children became concerned in October 1997, after months of not hearing from her, when she failed to call her son to wish him a happy birthday. Leydon called the Commonwealth Bank telebanking line on 21 October, where Barter did her banking, to check for activity on the account, discovering it had been emptied of more than $80,000 in daily increments of $5,000 between August and September from branches in Byron Bay, Burleigh Heads, and Ashmore Queensland. She also discovered, through a friend at customs that on the morning of 2 August 1997, less than a day after speaking to Leydon from Tunbridge Wells in England, her passport returned to Australia via Brisbane.

Leydon immediately travelled to Byron Bay and filed a police report with this information. Despite never physically sighting Barter, police told Leydon that she was alive and did not want to be contacted. They marked the report as "an occurrence" as opposed to an investigation of a missing person. Unhappy with these findings, Barter’s father decided to ask the Salvation Army Missing Persons Bureau for help in locating his daughter, convinced that her decision to leave was out of character for her.

In March 1999, Jack Wilson received a suspicious letter from The Salvation Army claiming that a Missing Person’s police officer spoke to a security officer at Colonial State Bank who said that Barter 'spoke of starting a new life,' and, in 1990 (not 1997), withdrew the balance of her account in Ashmore. The inconsistencies and errors in the letter made Leydon concerned that the inquiries were not taken seriously. Many years later, the SA apologized and admitted that they never physically sighted Barter nor can they confirm if she truly made the statements in the letter.

Barter did not contact her family when Leydon got married in 1998 at The Southport School Chapel, nor in 2001 when her first granddaughter was born, in 2003 when her son died by suicide, or in 2003 when her father died after a long illness.

Subsequent investigations 
In 2007, Leydon contacted the Australian Federal Police missing persons unit asking for information on the ten-year anniversary of her mother’s disappearance. The AFP looked into the case and planned to use the case as the face of their annual "Missing Person's Week" campaign, hoping the public exposure might help bring in new information. But the New South Wales Police Force barred the use of her story in the campaign, citing the need to protect the investigation despite the fact that Leydon was told that there was no on-going investigation.

Beginning in 2009, the new cold case detective in Byron Bay uncovered five significant findings:

 The name change to Florabella Natalia Marion Remakel in May 1997. 
 Barter's 2 August 1997 return-flight customs card which claimed she was married, living in Luxembourg as a housewife, and staying in Australia for only three days.
 On 13 August 1997, her medicare card was used in Grafton under her old name.
 Her passport never left the country and her medicare card was never used again. 
 Police have not seen or spoken to her since 1997 and cannot locate her.

In 2010, the lead detective looked into a 2002 Crime Stoppers tip in which a man claimed a missing woman named Barter had been murdered and buried in bushland near the University of New England in Armidale, New South Wales. The detective investigated the tip alone, bringing a cadaver dog to his aid, for two days. The search was unsuccessful.

In 2011, the Byron Bay missing persons unit removed Barter from the NSW state missing persons register. In 2013, Leydon was contacted by a stranger named Clark Hunter via a private Facebook message that stated: "Natalia is alive but you (sic) never see her again. It was not her intention to disappear. She was forced." Leydon took a screenshot of the message, but the tip was never investigated by police.

In May 2019, the NSW Missing Persons' Unit disbanded and a new unit was formed. Australian Federal Police Homicide Review unit reopened the case and decided to put Barter on the National Missing Persons register for the first time in 23 years. In June 2021 New South Wales police and local government announced a $250,000 reward for information leading to the discovery of what happened to Barter. This was increased on 26 April 2022 to $500,000.

Inquest
In August 2020, the NSW State Coroner announced its decision to hold an inquest into Barter's disappearance and suspected death. The inquest allows the court to compel witnesses to testify, to disclose all police records concerning her disappearance, and to gather information from other police agencies and organisations in Australia and other countries she may have visited or lived in.

The inquest began in June 2021, before Coroner Teresa O'Sullivan with ten days of evidence from police officers and members of Barter's family. The inquest then sat for another ten days in February 2022 and three days in April 2022 to hear the evidence of a man called Ric Blum who says he had two brief affairs with Barter, first in the 1960s then again in 1997 very shortly before she disappeared, making him one of the last people to see her. The inquest also heard from former Queensland police officers working at the Missing Persons Bureau, staff of the Commonwealth Bank, Ric Blum's wife of 45 years, and two other women with whom Blum had extra-marital relationships in the 1990s. The inquest sat for one further day in October 2022 to hear the evidence of a Byron Bay bank employee who says they remembered serving Marion Barter in 1997. 

The 2022 sessions were streamed on the Coroner's Court of New South Wales' YouTube channel. The coroner was scheduled to hand down her verdict by 30 November 2022 but on 29 November it was announced that the Findings had been vacated. A statement from Courts Media quoted by The Lady Vanishes podcast in a special announcement said "There is no future date at this stage and it is postponed following further investigations.”

On 20 March 2023 it was announced that the Coroner will consider another three days of hearings from 31 May 2023.

Media 
Seven News began a crime podcast series called The Lady Vanishes in April 2019, which focuses on Barter's disappearance and the subsequent inquisition. It is hosted by award-winning Freedom of information editor Alison Sandy and investigative reporter Bryan Seymour, with Sally Leydon's participation. The ongoing series has been downloaded over 10 million times. Prior to its release, Leydon took NSW police to court for access to her mother's police file to find out why Barter was removed from the state's missing person's register despite never locating her and why police assumed she was intentionally missing. Guests on the show include Scotland Yard criminal behavior analyst and founder of Paladin, Laura Richards; retired homicide detective senior sergeant Ron Iddles; and Ita Buttrose, an Australian businesswoman and chairperson of the Australian Broadcasting Corporation, who had presented Barter with an award.

See also
List of people who disappeared mysteriously: post-1970

References

External links 
 Marion Barter, The National Missing Persons Coordination Centre (NMPCC), Australian Federal Police
 Marion Barter at The Doe Network

1990s missing person cases
Missing person cases in Australia